A cactus is a member of the plant family Cactaceae.

Cactus may also refer to:

Music
 Cactus (American band), a rock band
 Cactus (Cactus album), their eponymous first album
 Cactus (Indian band), a Bangla band
 Cactus, an extension of the Bengali band Mohiner Ghoraguli
 Cactus (Bobby Kapp and Matthew Shipp album), 2016
 Cactus (record label), a UK record label
 "Cactus" (Pixies song), 1988
 "Cactus" (A.C.E song), 2017

Film and television
 Cactus (1986 film), directed by Paul Cox
 Cactus (2008 film), an Australian mystery-thriller
 Cactus (TV series), a 1998 Iranian satirical TV series

Technology
 Cactus Framework, a software framework
 Jakarta Cactus, a software testing framework
 CACTUS, an Air Cherenkov Telescope 
 Citroën C4 Cactus, a small family car
 Cactus (camera equipment brand)

Military
 , a Union Navy steamer in the American Civil War
 Operation Cactus, the Indian Army intervention in the 1988 Maldives coup d'état
 Cactus, the South African designation for the Crotale missile system
 Cactus, a nuclear test conducted by the US in 1958 as part of Operation Hardtack I
 Kaktus, an improvement of Soviet Kontakt-5 armour
 Cactus, US military codename for Guadalcanal Island during World War II, giving rise to the name Cactus Air Force for the USAAF, USMC, and USN air units in and around the island.

Places

United States
 Cactus, Kansas, a former settlement
 Cactus, Texas, a city
 Cactus Plain, Arizona
 Cactus Range, a small mountain range in Nevada

Elsewhere
Cactus Beach, a surfing beach in South Australia
 Cactus Ridge, Okinawa, site of fighting in World War II

Business
 Cactus (supermarket), in Luxembourg
 Cactus Theater, a theater in Lubbock, Texas
 Cactus Motor Lodge, a motel in Tucumcari, New Mexico, on the National Register of Historic Places
 Cactus (interbank network), an ATM network in Nevada

People
 Cactus Pete Piersanti (1916–1994), American hotel and casino promoter
 Françoise Cactus (1964–2021), French musician and author
 Richard Cactus Pryor (1923–2011), American broadcaster and humorist
 Jonatan Söderström, Swedish independent game developer known as "Cactus"
 John Nance Garner (1868–1967), American politician and lawyer, 32nd Vice President of the United States and 39th Speaker of the United States House of Representatives, known as "Cactus Jack"

Other uses
 Cactus (crustacean), the crustacean genus
 Cactus graph or cactus, a type of connected graph
 , a United States Coast Guard seagoing buoy tender
 "The Cactus", a short story by O. Henry from the collection Waifs and Strays
 Cactus, callsign for US Airways
 Cactus, callsign for the former America West Airlines, which merged into US Airways
 Cactus Plant Flea Market, American clothing brand established in 2015
 Cacti (software), an open-source, web-based network monitoring and graphing tool
 Cactus Yearbook, the yearbook of the University of Texas since 1894, published by Texas Student Media

See also
 "Les Cactus", a 1967 single by French singer-songwriter Jacques Dutronc
 The Cactus Album, the 1989 debut album of hip hop trio 3rd Bass